The fatty-acid-binding proteins (FABPs) are a family of transport proteins for fatty acids and other lipophilic substances such as eicosanoids and retinoids.  These proteins are thought to facilitate the transfer of fatty acids between extra- and intracellular membranes.  Some family members are also believed to transport lipophilic molecules from outer cell membrane to certain intracellular receptors such as PPAR. The FABPs are intracellular carriers that “solubilize” the endocannabinoid anandamide (AEA), transporting AEA to the breakdown by FAAH, and compounds that bind to FABPs block AEA breakdown, raising its level. The cannabinoids (THC and CBD) are also discovered to bind human FABPs (1, 3, 5, and 7) that function as intracellular carriers, as THC and CBD inhibit the cellular uptake and catabolism of AEA by targeting FABPs. Competition for FABPs may in part or wholly explain the increased circulating levels of endocannabinoids reported after consumption of cannabinoids. Levels of fatty-acid-binding protein have been shown to decline with ageing in the mouse brain, possibly contributing to age-associated decline in synaptic activity.

Family members 

Members of this family include:

Pseudogenes

References

External links 
 

 

Water-soluble transporters